John Hassall  (21 May 18688 March 1948) was  an English illustrator, known for his advertisements and poster designs.

Biography 
Hassall was born in Walmer, Kent on the 21st of May, 1868, the eldest son of Lieutenant Christopher Clark Hassall R. N., of a Cheshire family of wine-merchants, and his wife, Louisa, daughter of the Rev. Joseph Butterworth Owen, incumbent of St. Jude's, Chelsea. Owen's early life was marked by tragedy. Hassall's father, who had served in the fleet at the siege of Sevastapol, was paralysed as the result of an accident on board ship. He died at the age of thirty-eight. His mother later remarried an officer in the Royal Marines at Chatham, who later became General Sir William Purvis Wright, K.C.B. 

He was educated in Worthing, at Newton Abbot College, and at Neuenheim College, Heidelberg. After twice failing entry to  The Royal Military Academy Sandhurst, he emigrated to Manitoba in Canada in 1888 to begin farming with his brother Owen. He returned to London two years later when he had drawings accepted by the Graphic. At the suggestion of Dudley Hardy (along with Cecil Aldin, a lifelong friend), he studied art in Antwerp and Paris.  During this time he was influenced by the famous poster artist Alphonse Mucha.

In 1895, he began work as an advertising artist for David Allen & Sons, a career which lasted fifty years and included such well-known projects as the poster "Skegness Is so Bracing" (1908).  Between 1896 and 1899 alone, he produced over 600 theatre poster designs for this firm while, at the same time, providing illustrations to several illustrated newspapers. Making use of flat colours enclosed by thick black lines, his poster style was very suitable for children's books, and he produced many volumes of nursery rhymes and fairy stories, such as Mother Goose’s Nursery Rhymes (1909).

In 1901, Hassall was elected to the membership of the Royal Institute of Painters in Water Colours and the Royal Society of Miniature Painters. He also belonged to several clubs, including the Langham (until 1898), the Savage, and the London Sketch Club, of which he was a President from 1903-1904. He belonged to the literary club The Sette of Odd Volumes and illustrated their privately printed menus, including one of a broken bust of Jane Austen for the club's "Night of the Divine Jane" in 1902.

In 1900, Hassall opened his own New Art School and School of Poster Design in Kensington where he numbered Annie Fish, Bert Thomas, Bruce Bairnsfather, H. M. Bateman and Harry Rountree among his students. The school was closed at the outbreak of the First World War. In the post-war period, he ran the very successful John Hassall Correspondence School.
 
John Hassall was the father of poet Christopher Hassall and the printmaker Joan Hassall, OBE.  He was also the grandfather of the actress Imogen Hassall and grandfather (and surrogate father) to noted "green" architect, David Dobereiner.

Works 
Arguably John Hassall's most famous creation was  "The Jolly Fisherman" in 1908, which is regarded as one of the most famous holiday advertisements of all time in the United Kingdom. His 1910 design for the Kodak Girl, in her iconic striped blue and white dress, became a feature of Kodak's advertising to the 1970s. Hassall's design was continually updated to reflect changing fashions and trends and was longer-lasting and of greater international significance than his Jolly Fisherman.

References

Cuppleditch, David. "The John Hassall Lifestyle," London: The Dilke Press, 1979.

External links

Works by John Hassall at Toronto Public Library
John Hassall Genealogy and Family History Tree

1868 births
1948 deaths
People from Walmer
British illustrators
British poster artists
Members of the Royal Institute of Painters in Water Colours